Route 522 is the main road in Gulistan District in Farah Province, Afghanistan.  This 40 kilometer dirt road connects Gulistan with Delaram.  It is expected to undergo major improvements to make it a compacted gravel road starting in the summer of 2010.

Notes

Farah Province
Nimruz Province
Roads in Afghanistan